Charles Sinclair "Charlie" Rogers (born June 1, 1937 in National City, California) is an American competitive sailor and Olympic medalist. He won a bronze medal in the Dragon class at the 1964 Summer Olympics in Tokyo, together with Lowell North and Richard Deaver.

References

External links
 
 
 

1937 births
Living people
American male sailors (sport)
Olympic bronze medalists for the United States in sailing
Sailors at the 1964 Summer Olympics – Dragon
Medalists at the 1964 Summer Olympics
People from National City, California
Sportspeople from San Diego County, California
San Diego Yacht Club sailors